Horseland is an American animated series produced by DIC Entertainment Corporation. It is a comic mischief program following events in the lives of a group of children riding at Horseland, an equestrian school and stables. Their adventures include riding their horses and entering them in competitions to test their skill and friendships. The show premiered on September 16, 2006, as part of CBS's new Saturday morning cartoon block, KOL Secret Slumber Party on CBS later KEWLopolis (now Cookie Jar TV). Concurrent with the series, the online virtual pet game that it was based upon was updated to complement the show by launching a new "Junior version" of the game based on the program and featuring its various characters and locations. After three seasons, the show was canceled on CBS on December 6, 2008. Reruns of Horseland then aired nationwide on the digital subchannel This TV; two episodes aired each weekend until September 2010. Horseland last aired as part of Cookie Jar TV on CBS. It has 7 books for the series related to the episodes which are available to be purchased online.

Plot 
Set on the fictional ranch of Horseland Stables, the series follows the adventures of six pre-teens (Sarah, Alma, Molly, Chloe, Zoey, and Bailey) and their horses, who each deal with their own life situations. Almost every episode is narrated in flashback by Shep the rough collie, who gives its featured lesson to Teeny the pig and Angora the cat in the opening and ending scenes.

Characters 
The characters of Horseland are usually limited to the group of kids who are frequently at the stable. However, some episodes (especially those which involve travelling), introduce one-time characters as a plot device.

Sarah Whitney and Scarlet 
Sarah is a pretty 12-year-old English-American girl who likes to make friends, and the central character of the series. She is very friendly and loves to encourage others to do their best and have fun. She comes from a rich family, but does never consider herself better than others because of it. She stays more loyal to Molly, Alma and Bailey, and later Nani when she joins in Season 3. Sarah has wavy blonde hair with bleached highlights and baby blue eyes. She also has silver hoop earrings with piercings in her ears. Sarah wears a red riding jacket with a matching red necktie and white pants. She has been seen in younger ages and different hairstyles in flashbacks. She was voiced by Dana Donlan.

Sarah's horse is Scarlet, a purebred black Shagya Arabian mare who has a long, black mane and tail with red highlights. Scarlet is fearless, level-headed, and regal, but at times can be unstable and prefer to be left alone. She is patient and loving, much like her owner, and is great with kids. Her symbol is a red crown, representing royalty. She was voiced by Andrea Ware.

Molly Washington and Calypso 
Molly is a 12-year-old African-American girl who often deals with life's issues through humor. She is very funny, creative, and appealing. She enjoys making fun of herself and, at times, her friends, which can cause them to get annoyed at the fact that she doesn't seem to take much seriously. However, Molly can become serious and ride a horse just as well as the others when her friends are depending on her. She is good at Western riding with Calypso and is the only one to consistently wear her hair in a ponytail. Molly wears a pink riding jumper and white pants. Her father is a dentist and she has a younger sister named Lissa, who also expresses an interest in horses. She was voiced by Aleyah Smith.

Molly's horse is Calypso, a chestnut blanket Appaloosa mare with a cream white mane and tail with pink highlights. She is warm-hearted, laid back, affectionate, and a bit slow. When she learns something once, she's learned it for life. She likes her friends and rider dearly, and is best friends with Button, who always jumps to Calypso's defense. She speaks with a Caribbean accent. Her symbol is a pink heart, representing love. She was voiced by Tiffany White-Welchen.

Alma Rodriguez and Button 
Alma is a 12-year-old girl and comes from a tight-knit Mexican-American family. She is the best jumper at Horseland. While living in Mexico, her grandfather gave her a medallion of St. Martin of Tours. Later, Alma and her family moved to the United States. Alma's father is the manager at Horseland. He taught her how to ride when she was younger. Besides horse riding, Alma loves to read. Alma is also constantly using the knowledge she learns from Internet. She was voiced by Emily Hernandez.

Alma's horse is Button, a black and white pinto trakehner mare with green highlights in her mane.  Her owner is Alma, whom she has been with for 10 years, coming from Mexico to Horseland when Alma and her family moved. She has a Mexican accent. She likes to please Alma and does never work very hard to do so. She is fully focused and talented, especially at jumping, and has earned the title of "The best jumper at Horseland". When she has to do something important, Button is extremely focused and patient and is ready to do whatever it takes to get it done, including going over show acts in the pouring rain, or constantly going over jump after jump, and she's best friends with Calypso. Her symbol is a clover, representing luck. She was voiced by Laura Marr, Tiffany White-Welchen in some episodes.

Bailey Handler and Aztec 
Bailey is the 13-year-old son of the Horseland owners. He often takes risks and bets not considering the consequences of his actions, and enjoys joking around and having a good time. He loves horses and animals, and insists that they be treated with kindness and gentleness. Bailey has a dark brown mullet and dark blue eyes, and is considered the local heartthrob at the stables, much to his own embarrassment. Bailey's shown to wear a dark blue long sleeved shirt with the sleeves rolled up and light blue pants. He sometimes wears a cowboy hat. He was voiced by David Kalis.

Bailey's horse is Aztec, a brown Kiger Mustang stallion with dark blue highlights. He frequently acts irritable and nonchalant, but he does honestly care about his friends and the other animals. He is often protective of his mare friends, much to their irritation, and has shown great courage, determination, and leadership skills. His symbol is a dark blue lightning bolt, representing strength. He was voiced by D. Kevin Williams.

Chloe Stilton and Chili 
Chloe is 12 years old and the twin sister of Zoey, and one of the two anti-heroes of the series. Chloe is the oldest twin and a confident, skilled young girl who likes to let other people know of her talents. She comes from a affluent family and can often be conceited, self-centered, and depthless. However, like her sister, Chloe can also be very friendly and polite with the other girls. She has an unrequited crush on Bailey, and would go to great lengths to impress him. She is especially fond of fashion and makeup, and loves to look great when she rides. Though Chloe is competitive with her sister, Zoey, they still support each other when it's important. Chloe has strawberry blonde hair and light green eyes. She is wearing a lavender jumper, a lavender headband and purple pants. She was voiced by Bianca Heyward (season 1-2) and Caroline Iliff (season 3).

Chloe's horse is Chili, a light grey Dutch Warmblood stallion with lavender highlights in his mane and tail. Chili shares Chloe's confidence to the point that he feels he is the most talented horse at Horseland, though he often feels upstaged and unappreciated by his showy rider. He and Aztec disagree with each other frequently, but they do never let it ruin their friendship. Both Chili and his rider are talented in dressage. His symbol is a lavender diamond, representing discipline. He was voiced by Stephen Michael Shelton.

Zoey Stilton and Pepper 
Zoey is 12 years old and the twin sister of Chloe, as well as the second anti-hero of the series. Zoey is the youngest twin and takes a more devious approach with her competitiveness, and is into fashion and makeup. She is talented in cross country, and is even captain of Horseland's cross-country team. She likes to show off and can be quite flirtatious with the boys that she meets. She is competitive with her sister Chloe, but they still support each other when it depends. Zoey can be shallow and rude, but she can also be thoughtful and nice. Zoey has wavy red hair, freckles and green eyes and is wearing a blue short-sleeved top and white pants. She wqs voiced by Bianca Heyward (season 1-2) and Caroline Iliff (season 3).

Zoey's horse is Pepper, a gorgeous dark gray purebred Dutch Warmblood mare with light blue highlights in her wavy mane and tail. Pepper is quick-tempered and cranky, donning a large ego and confidence to match. While she likes her rider and is good friends with Chili, she often clashes with the other horses, as a herd they manage to still remain friends. Like Zoey, Pepper is cynical, spirited, and likes to compete. Her symbol is a blue crescent moon, representing grace. She was voiced by Tifanie Christun.

Will Taggert and Jimber 
Will is 15 years old, relaxed, and good-looking. Will is often put in charge of the ranch while Bailey's parents are away. He is Bailey's cousin and has lived with Bailey's family ever since he was younger. Mature and insightful, he often acts as an adult figure to the rest of the kids and also serves as their riding instructor and mentor. He loves to listen to country music and is great at horse riding, whether it be Western and English. He has blonde hair and greyish-blue eyes. He's shown to wear a black short-sleeved shirt with a horseshoe pendant around his neck, and dark blue pants. In "The Secret", Will reveals that he has dyslexia, just like Sarah's cousin, Chase. He always helps her when she's down and defends her when she is hurt. He was voiced by Vincent Michael.

Will's horse is Jimber, a powerful Quarter Horse palomino colored gelding with black highlights in his mane. Similar to Will, he has a commanding presence among the others at Horseland, and worked as a ranch horse before coming to Horseland. He's a bit older in years in comparison to the other horses, but is dependable and wise. Jimber speaks with a Southern accent. His symbol is a black star, representing loyalty. He was voiced by Kelcey Watson.

Nani Cloud and Sunburst 
Nani is a 12-year-old Native American girl who appears in several episodes during season 3. She is proud of her Cherokee heritage and loves nature and horses. Nani has black hair and hazel eyes, and is shown to wear light blue and light yellow. She is quick to defend herself and accidentally stirs up a rivalry between her and Zoey for the position of leadership for the cross-country team at Horseland. Nani is calm, friendly, intelligent and good with animals. She was voiced by Rachel Ware.

Nani's horse is Sunburst, a generally calm and polite palomino Paint gelding with gold highlights. He cannot stand to wear saddles and prefers to be ridden bareback, though he gets used to saddles eventually. Like their owners, he at first starts out on bad terms with Pepper, but the two eventually become friends, and he later begins to show great concern for her well-being. Unlike many of the other horses, he rarely lets mean words affect him. He has a single braid under his mane. His symbol is a yellow sun with blue lights, representing dignity. He was voiced by Cork Ramer.

Shep 
Shep is a wise male collie, who acts as the leader of the animals at Horseland, and is the narrator of the series. He is a very loyal ranch dog and always helps the horses in times of trouble. Shep often serves as the voice of reason for Teeny and Angora, and, to illustrate a moral or lesson, frequently relates stories to Teeny (most of the episodes are actually flashbacks to past events). He is friendly, perceptive, and protective of both the horses and the riders at Horseland. His owner is Bailey. Shep has been with him since he was a pup. Shep would frequently break the fourth wall from time to time, addressing the audience about the episode's lesson. He was voiced by Jerry Longe.

Teeny 
Teeny is a young, adorable, chubby black-and-white female pot-bellied pig who wears a pink ribbon on her tail. She shows a innocent, naive personality, and often becomes anxious over relatively small situations. She is well-intentioned, though simple-minded, and Shep usually acts as a friend and mentor to Teeny, in contrast to Angora, who frequently teases her. Although Teeny rarely understands situations, she is a compassionate young piglet who gets very worried about others when there is trouble. She was voiced by Michelle Zacharia.

Angora 
Angora is a gray, long-haired Turkish Angora with bangs that sweep over her eyes, white chest tuft, green eyes and a pink collar. She is often dismissive of other animals, and feels that she deserves better treatment than anyone else, due to her self-absorbed and arrogant nature. Angora's favorite people are Chloe and Zoey because they're so much like her. A running gag in the series involves her love of trouble (and hatred of peace) at Horseland. However, she shows authentic concern whenever Shep and Teeny are in true danger. She was voiced by Marissa Shea.

Cubby 
Cubby is a brown Pomeranian puppy. He was found abandoned by Bailey in "New Pup in Town". Bailey later adopted Cubby in that same episode. He is cute and well-meaning, much like Teeny. Alma becomes jealous because she wants a dog, but because her father is the foreman at Horseland, she's not allowed to have one. Shep is initially jealous of Cubby. When Cubby runs away, Alma and Shep put their jealous feelings aside and help Bailey bring him home. Alma takes Bailey up on his offer to share Cubby with him. Shep and Cubby eventually become friends.

Secondary characters

Simbala and Ranak 
Simbala is an Indian girl who meets the Horseland gang on a trip to France in the episode "International Sarah". She is thoughtful, sweet-natured, and is proud of her culture, choosing to wear traditional dress and a bindi. Her father knows Sarah's father, and the two girls became friends after falling into a cave. She loves riding, fresh fruit, and dental floss.

Simbala's horse is Ranak, a black stallion with a blaze. He hates plane rides, but enjoys sugar cubes and being alone. After initially irritating the other horses with his worried whinnying, he apologizes and becomes friendly to them. He also has an accent. His color is dark blue.

Jesse Golden and Buddy 
Jesse is a boy who visits Horseland while his parents' farm, Golden Corral Ranch, is being remodeled. He appears in the episode "Bailey's New Friend", in which he unintentionally causes Sarah to feel like Bailey doesn't like her anymore. Like Bailey, he enjoys video games, taking care of his horse, talking, and being a bit of a daredevil. Both Molly and Alma mention that he's a "cutie", and Chloe and Zoey express that they think he is "hot"; Chloe also describes him as a "total babe".

Jesse's horse is Buddy, a large black flaxen stallion. He is brave, headstrong, and misses his home while away. He has teal stripes in his mane and tail. He is skittish at first but eventually gets used to the place.

Alexander Buglick and Bucephalus 
Alexander is Alma's pen pal, seen in the episode "First Love". While his letters to her made him seem like a wealthy champion rider, an intentional facade meant to impress her, he really only rides for fun, and is rather timid. His parents are the proprietors of a traveling circus. However, he admires Alma and her incredible riding abilities, and shares her love of reading. He likes to compare himself with the great Macedonian general, Alexander the Great.

His horse is a kind, humble stallion named Bucephalus, in honor of Alexander the Great's famous steed. He performs in the circus and enjoys his life, despite its lack of glamour. His color is maroon.

Mary Whitney and Prince 
Mary is Sarah and Chase's cousin, a entertaining, independent girl who does never let the fact that she is blind get in the way of her positive attitude and independence. Mary appears in the episode "A True Gift". She has a clever return for most insults that Zoey throws at her, and understandably hates it when her friends are patronizing toward her, though she's also polite about it. She loves horses, riding, and the outdoors.

Mary's horse is Prince, a white Thoroughbred stallion who is said to be the fastest horse ever to come to Horseland, a 'fact' that causes Scarlet to get jealous and worry that she'll be replaced. Sarah temporarily rode him in Scarlet's place in order to make sure that he was a good enough horse for Mary. He also has a white wavy mane and tail with light blue highlights.

Talia Bentley and Kisses 
Talia is a talented but mean-spirited girl who is both confident and competitive. She appears in the episode "Changing Spots" and is the premier show jumper at Stanhope Academy, Horseland's biggest rival. She is Alma's nemesis, and the two show special animosity towards each other after they get in a fight about who deserves to win an upcoming competition.

Talia's horse is Kisses, a beautiful Camarillo White Horse mare. She is an excellent show jumper, but is not giving a chance to speak to any of the other horses. Her highlight color is light pink.

Chase Whitney and Wonder 
Chase is Sarah and Mary's cousin who comes to visit in the episode "The Secret". He feels embarrassed about his dyslexia and tries to hide his difficulty with reading from the others. Despite this, he is still very friendly and enjoys making people laugh. Chase has light brown hair and blue eyes.

His horse Wonder is a dark bay Anglo-Arabian stallion with green stripes. Wonder does not talk to any of the horses in the episode.

Other characters

Jasmin and Amber 
Jasmin and Amber are two of Molly's close friends from the city. Both of the girls are confident, loud, and playful, and enjoy having a good time all the time. Neither of them go to Horseland, but do express an interest in horseback riding. Despite frequently teasing Molly, the two are genuinely supportive of her interests. Amber is African-American, and has dark brown eyes and long wavy hair. Jasmine is of an Asian ethnicity, and has light hazel eyes and black hair.

Linnea, Alexia and Windy 
Linnea is a princess that visits Horseland in disguise, pretending to be the princess' assistant, while Alexia, her maid, pretends to be the princess. Both have light blonde hair, blue eyes, and favor the color light pink, although Alexia is much shorter than her companion. Throughout the episode, Linnea becomes close friends with Sarah.

Linnea's horse is Windy, a mare who looks like Talia's Kisses and wears an ornate bridle. She also has a volumous wavy mane and tail. She doesn't understand English and only speaks Icelandic, and fails to respond to any of the other horses' attempts to speak to her, causing them to think she was rude.

Diablo 
Diablo is a red Welsh stallion with an injured back leg who belongs to a girl named Madison. He initially has aggressive and rude behavior and was brought to Horseland so that Sarah could use her "way with horses" to try to help him recover. His only appearance is "The Horse Whisperer". His name means "devil" in Spanish. He also has a wavy mane and tail. He is voiced by D. Kevin Williams.

Puma 
Puma is a buckskin pinto mustang stallion staying at Horseland to be tamed by Will. His mane and tail are black with white stripes. His only appearance is in the episode "Wild Horses". He tells Aztec about what it's like living in the wild, which prompts Aztec to run away. Puma, however, liked the wonderful treatment he was given at Horseland. It is mentioned that he likes oats, which is shown in the same episode.

Wild Horses 
These horses are met by Aztec when he runs away from Horseland. The two identified by name are Chaco, a black mustang stallion who doesn't want Aztec on their territory, and Mesa, a cream colt that befriends Aztec. Other horses in the herd are a pair of bays, Mesa's cream mother, and a brown paint female. They all have plain manes and tails.

River 
River is a well-known racehorse stallion that comes to Horseland to recuperate from a leg injury. He is dark grey with a white mane and tail, and has periwinkle stripes. His only appearance is "A Horse Named River", during which it's revealed that he's become a polite, but elderly and unenthusiastic horse, nothing like the speedy youthful stallion Chili's been a fan of his whole life. He was younger and belonged to an unnamed girl in flashbacks. He was voiced by Peter Elliott

Cream and Sugar 
Cream is a white-colored colt that has light pink stripes, while Sugar is a light gray filly that has light blue stripes. They are fraternal twins, and only appear in the episode "Oh, Baby". They visit Horseland when their mother was sick and could not take care of them. They were voiced by Eugene Jaramillo and Grace Bydalek.

Additional voices 

Dana Donlan as Sarah Whitney
Emily Hernandez as Alma Rodriguez, Calypso
Bianca Heyward as Chloe Stilton
Caroline Iliff as Zoey Stilton/Chloe Stilton, season 3
David Kalis as Bailey Handler
Jerry Longe as Shep
Laura Marr as Button
Vincent Michael as Will Taggert
Marissa Shea as Angora
Aleyah Smith as Molly Washington
Michelle Zacharia as Teeney
Joe Dinghman
Ben Birkholtz
Courtney Britt
Tifanie Christun as Pepper
Stephen Shelton as Chili
Andrea Ware as Scarlet
Kelcey Watson as Jimber
Tiffany White-Welchen as Calypso
D. Kevin Williams as Aztec
Rachel Ware as Nani Cloud
Brice Altman
Benjamin Beck
Susan B. Collins
Nils Haaland
Caroline Lliff
Moral Masuoka
Cork Ramer
Samantha Triba
Prenisha Barfield
Miranda Christine
Cody Fox
R.C. Cash
John Michael Lee
Roz Parr
Ryle Smith
Mary Waltman

Episode guide

Season 1: (2006)

Season 2: (2007)

Season 3: (2008)

DVD release 
In 2007, NCircle Entertainment released two DVDs of the series, titled "Friends First... Win or Lose" and "Taking the Heat", each containing 2 episodes. In 2008, two more DVDs, titled "To Tell the Truth" and "The Fast and the Fearless" were released, each containing 3 episodes. All of the DVDs included trailers for other cartoons, bonus features, and interactive menus.

Mill Creek Entertainment released the complete series on DVD in Region 1 on October 12, 2010, containing all of the episodes of the series and including 5 other Cookie Jar-owned shows as bonus cartoons which are Busytown Mysteries, Mona the Vampire, Dance Revolution, The Country Mouse and the City Mouse Adventures and Postcards from Buster. Mill Creek also released a 10-episode best of set titled "The Greatest Stable Ever!" in the same year which features the first 10 episodes of the third season, and also included an episode of Mona the Vampire as a bonus. These releases have since been discontinued and are out of print. Later in January 2018, Mill Creek re-released the complete series on DVD, excluding the bonus cartoons.

See also 
 Horseland

External links 
 
 Horseland

References 

2006 American television series debuts
2008 American television series endings
2000s American animated television series
CBS original programming
American children's animated education television series
American children's animated fantasy television series
English-language television shows
Television series by DIC Entertainment
Television series by DHX Media
Animated television series about children
Animated television series about horses